Lars Håvard Haugen (born November 29, 1969)  is a Norwegian guitarist, songwriter and multi-instrumentalist.

Career 
Through his virtuous playing, Haugen has gained a status as one of the greatest contemporary guitarists in Norway, and is best known as the lead guitarist in Hellbillies, where he plays alongside his brother and lead singer Aslag Haugen. He has also made a name for himself with the releases of his debut solo album, Six Strings and the Truth, which was well received by critics and guitarists around the world.

Besides playing, he has produced and co-produced music for many notable Norwegian acts including BigBang, Jonas Fjeld, Ole Paus and more.

Haugen has listed such names as Steve Morse and Dixie Dregs, Albert Lee, Brent Mason, Jerry Donahue, Eric Clapton and Stevie Ray Vaughan as his influences.

Discography

Solo albums 
2011: Six Strings And The Truth (Capitol Records)

Collaborations 
With Hellbillies

1992: Sylvspente Boots (Spinner Records)
1993: Pela Stein (Spinner Records)
1995: Lakafant (RCA)
1996: Drag (RCA)
1996: Live Laga (RCA), live album
1999: Sol Over Livet (RCA)
2001: Urban Twang (WEA)
2004: CoolTur (WEA), live album
2004: Niende (WEA)
2007: Spissrotgang (EMI)
2010: Leite etter Lykka (EMI)
2012: Tretten (EMI)
2014: Levande Live (NorCD), live album

With The Respatexans
1999: Almost Famous (RCA)
2005: Shine On (MW Records Norway)

With HGH (Hagfors/Gebhardt/Haugen)
1999: Pignoise (Stickman Records)

With Bigbang
2007: (Too) (Much) (Yang) (Grand Sport Records)

With Martin Hagfors
2009: Men And Flies (Me Records)

References

External links 

Lars Haavard Haugen - The Truth and Six Strings - the interview on the album, Rock Guitar Daily
Lars Håvard Haugen releases new solo album, Multe music

1969 births
Living people
Norwegian guitarists
Norwegian male guitarists
Norwegian songwriters
Norwegian multi-instrumentalists